The Real World: Philadelphia is the fifteenth season of MTV's reality television series The Real World, which focuses on a group of diverse strangers living together for several months in a different city each season, as cameras follow their lives and interpersonal relationships. It is the third season of The Real World to be filmed in the Mid-Atlantic States region of the United States, specifically in Pennsylvania.

The season featured seven people who lived in a three-story building, and production began filming from April 30 to August 20, 2004. The season premiered on September 7 of that year and consisted of 26 episodes.  The season premiere was watched by 3.3 million viewers.

Season changes
The Philadelphia season is the first with two openly gay men, Karamo Brown and William Hernandez, in the cast. (The first season to have two gay cast members, regardless of sex, was the 2002 Chicago season, although the 1999 Hawaii season featured a bisexual woman and a gay man).

Assignment
Beginning with the show's fifth season, almost every season of The Real World has included the assignment of a season-long group job or task to the housemates, continued participation in which has been mandatory to remain part of the cast since the Back to New York season. The Philadelphia cast worked for the Philadelphia Soul, an Arena Football League team which was formerly partly owned by Jon Bon Jovi. As part of their duties for the Soul, the cast planned and built a playground for underprivileged children as part of the Northern Home for Children program.

The residence

The cast lived in a building at 249-251 Arch Street at 3rd Street in Old City Philadelphia. The , three-story building, which is adjacent to the Betsy Ross House, was built in 1902, and is known as the Union Bank of Philadelphia Building until 1970, when it was sold to Seamen's Church Institute to house global seafarers. It was placed on the Philadelphia Register of Historic Places in January 1977, and purchased in 2003 by Yaron Properties, Inc for $2.2 million USD. An additional $3 million was spent on renovating and furnishing the building for production of the series, which included 42 mounted cameras for filming. The interior was designed by Norm Dodge of Norm Dodge & Associates.

In March 2004, producers ceased construction after completing two thirds of the project, and announced they were leaving Philadelphia because of disputes with Philadelphia trade unions. Joey Carson, CEO of Bunim/Murray Productions, and Ted Kenney, a producer on The Real World, met in private over a two-week period with the trade unions. The meetings were brokered by Mayor John F. Street, Governor Ed Rendell, Congressman Bob Brady, and other civic leaders in order to keep the production in Philadelphia. The flap delayed renovations by several weeks. The interior decorations used for the series remained until as late as October 2004. Since filming ended, the building has served as an art gallery for the Art Institute of Philadelphia's F.U.E.L. Collection  and has become an office for Linode since late 2015.

Cast

: Age at the time of filming.

Episodes

Police altercation
On November 29, 2005, two Philadelphia police officers were arrested for aggravated assault, simple assault, criminal conspiracy and reckless endangerment, due to an altercation they had with a plainclothes officer guarding the Real World house during filming the previous year. According to UPI and TMZ.com, Officers Patrick Cavalieri and David McAndrews were off-duty when they went to the house during filming of the program, and began banging on the door. Officer Brian Copeland, the plain clothes officer guarding the house, tried to stop them, and was allegedly assaulted by the two fellow policemen, who were suspended for 30 days with the intent to dismiss, according to a department spokesman. Cavalieri, a five-year veteran of the force, was eventually fired. One of the charges against him was dropped, but he was found not guilty of another, and reinstated in his job. He later sued the city and Copeland for violations of his civil and constitutional rights, asking for a minimum of $50,000 in damages. Copeland alleged that Cavalieri and his "friends" severely beat him, causing severe eye damage. Cavalieri alleged that Copeland was not an officially licensed police officer at the time of the incident, that he did not identify himself as an officer before attacking him, and that he lied several times during the investigation regarding his version of the incident and the injuries he incurred.

After filming
Seven months after the cast left the Real World house, all seven of them appeared to discuss their experiences both during and since their time on the show, Fistful of Philly: The Real World Philadelphia Reunion, which premiered on March 15, 2005, and was hosted by Vanessa Minnillo.

At the 2008 The Real World Awards Bash, Shavonda received a nomination in the "Best Phonecall Gone Bad" category.

William Hernandez continued his acting career, appearing in movies such as Evicted, The Undercover Man, The Narrow Gate, and A Four Letter Word.

In 2016, Karamo Brown appeared as a cast member on the TV One original series The Next :15. In 2017, he hosted Are You the One? Second Chances. He is currently a member of the "Fab 5" in the 2018 Netflix reboot of Queer Eye. In 2019, he took part in the 28th season of Dancing with the Stars, thus being the first person from The Real World to be cast on the show.

The Challenge

Challenge in bold indicates that the contestant was a finalist on the Challenge.

See also

References

External links
The Real World: Philadelphia at mtv.com
Episode list at mtv.com

Philadelphia
Television shows set in Philadelphia
2004 American television seasons
2005 American television seasons
Philadelphia Register of Historic Places
Television shows filmed in Pennsylvania